Enoch Mgijima Local Municipality is a local municipality of South Africa. It was established after the August 2016 local elections by the merging of Tsolwana, Inkwanca, Lukhanji local municipalities.

Politics

The municipal council consists of sixty-eight members elected by mixed-member proportional representation. Thirty-four councillors are elected by first-past-the-post voting in thirty-four wards, while the remaining thirty-four are chosen from party lists so that the total number of party representatives is proportional to the number of votes received. In the election of 1 November 2021 the African National Congress (ANC) won a majority of forty-four seats on the council.
The following table shows the results of the election.

References

Local municipalities of the Chris Hani District Municipality